Ronnie Harris (born June 4, 1970) is a former professional American football player who played wide receiver for seven seasons for the New England Patriots, Seattle Seahawks, and Atlanta Falcons. Although he was best known for his play on special teams, Harris made a key 29 yard catch in the Falcons upset victory in the 1999 NFC Championship over the Minnesota Vikings. Since retiring from football, Ronnie has worked for Pfizer pharmaceuticals in primary care, Cardiovascular Specialty and Pain Management.  Additionally Ronnie has earned a Masters of Arts in Ministry and Leadership from Western Seminary in Portland Oregon and worked in various churches as a youth pastor, associate pastor and campus pastor.

Harris ran track while at the University of Oregon and holds the second fastest indoor 50 meter time ever recorded at 5.7 seconds.

References

1970 births
Living people
American football wide receivers
Atlanta Falcons players
New England Patriots players
Oregon Ducks football players
Seattle Seahawks players
Players of American football from San Jose, California
People from Granada Hills, Los Angeles